is a former female singer. She was represented with LDH. Her label was King Records.

Biography
Shionoya was born in Moji-ku, Kitakyūshū, Fukuoka Prefecture.

In 2011, she participated in the Performing Arts Office LDH sponsored Exile Presents Vocal Battle Audition 3 –For Girls–. Of the approximately 30,000 people, Shionoya became a finalist of the Flower vocal division, but it was unsuccessful. After that, she went to the Exile Professional Gym (EXPG) school in Fukuoka.

In 2012, Shionoya joined King Record's 80th Anniversary Commemoration Nationwide Audition King Records Presents Dream Vocal Audition. In the final judging held at Akasaka Blitz on 26 May, the winner of 15 finalists from among more than 10,000 candidate candidates, one of the three Grand Prix "Dream Vocalist Loved by ViVi" was awarded, and decided her debut. In August, Shionoya's single came to Tokyo. In 13 October, at the Tokyo Girls Collection held at the Saitama Super Arena, she was selected as the next generation artist who took the most attention among the Audition's Grand Prix winners held throughout Japan, and debuted as "TGC 2012 A/W The Best Vocal Audition" she sang in front of 30,000 people before while.

On 23 January 2013, Shionoya made her major debut with the single "Dear Heaven".

On 18 May 2017, she announced her retirement in the entertainment industry.

Personal life
 In Vocal Battle Audition 3, Shionoya passed a pear to Reina Washio. Shionoya said that her "rivals are of course Flower, I want to keep trying each other."
 At a commemorative photo shooting, she is nicknamed "Shiochī", there is a pose called "Shiochī Pose" which represents "picking one salt" over the time, and at the release event etc., it was customary to take a photo with the visitors together with a shout of "Shio Cheese" at this pose.
 Shionoya's target singer was Yuna Ito.

Discography
Highest in the Oricon weekly ranking

Singles

Albums

Mini albums

Tie-ups

Filmography

Radio

Advertisements

Live

References

External links
  
  

 Former
  (April – October 2012) 
  (October 2012 – October 2015) 

Japanese women pop singers
King Records (Japan) artists
Musicians from Fukuoka Prefecture
1994 births
Living people
21st-century Japanese singers
21st-century Japanese women singers